Oleg Vladimirovich Chernyshov (born 23 December 1986) is a Russian professional football player. He plays for Spartak Tambov.

Club career
He made his Russian Premier League debut on 27 July 2019 for FC Tambov in a game against FC Spartak Moscow, as a 57th-minute substitute for Vladislav Kulik, at the age of 32.

On 21 February 2020, Chernyshov joined Aktobe on loan until the end of 2020.

References

External links
 

1986 births
Sportspeople from Tatarstan
People from Bugulma
Living people
Russian footballers
FC Vityaz Podolsk players
FC Bashinformsvyaz-Dynamo Ufa players
Association football defenders
FC Rubin Kazan players
FC Tambov players
FC Neftekhimik Nizhnekamsk players
FC Aktobe players
FC Spartak Tambov players
Russian Second League players
Russian First League players
Russian Premier League players
Kazakhstan First Division players
Kazakhstan Premier League players
Russian expatriate footballers
Russian expatriate sportspeople in Kazakhstan
Expatriate footballers in Kazakhstan